Oop-Pop-A-Da is an album by the Moe Koffman Quintet featuring trumpeter Dizzy Gillespie recorded in 1988 and released on the Soundwing label.

Reception 
The Allmusic review stated "Diz's trumpet playing was clearly past its prime by 1988, but his scat singing on "Oop-Pop-A-Da" is quite virtuosic and outstanding, easily the high point of this little-known set".

Track listing 
All compositions by Dizzy Gillespie except as indicated
 "Oop-Pop-A-Da" (Babs Gonzales) - 10:15 
 "Lush Life" (Billy Strayhorn) - 5:13 
 "Fried Banana" (Moe Koffman) - 4:40 
 "Elie's Dream" (Koffman) - 4:54 
 "No Siesta Ees Fiesta" (Koffman) - 4:32 
 "A Night in Tunisia" (Gillespie, Felix Paparelli) - 11:08 
 "Fun" (Bernie Senensky) - 6:03 
 "Groovin' High" - 8:20 
 "Jade Eyes" (Senesky) - 6:22

Personnel 
Dizzy Gillespie - trumpet, vocals
Moe Koffman - alto saxophone, soprano saxophone, flute
Ed Bickert - guitar
Bernie Senensky - keyboards
Kieran Overs - bass
Barry Elmes - drums

References 

Dizzy Gillespie albums
1988 albums